This list of universities in İzmir lists the universities within the city limits of İzmir

Public universities

Private universities

Former universities

See also 

 List of universities in Istanbul
 List of universities in Ankara
 List of universities in Turkey
 Education in Turkey

References 

Universities and colleges in İzmir
Universities in İzmir